Herman von Adlerberg (Герман фон Адлерберг) (9 December 1890 – 1919) was a sailor from the Russian Empire, who represented his country at the 1912 Summer Olympics in Nynäshamn, Sweden in the 8 Metre.

Further reading

References

Sailors at the 1912 Summer Olympics – 8 Metre
Male sailors (sport) from the Russian Empire
Olympic sailors from the Russian Empire
People from the Russian Empire of German descent
1890 births
1919 deaths